Bangsund Idrettslag is a Norwegian sports club from Bangsund, Nord-Trøndelag. It has sections for association football, team handball and skiing.

The men's football team currently plays in the Fifth Division, the sixth tier of Norwegian football. It last played in the Norwegian Second Division in 1998.

References

Football clubs in Norway
Sport in Trøndelag
Namsos

no:Bangsund#Bangsund IL